The Quickie Aircraft Corporation was founded in Mojave, California, in 1978 to market the Quickie homebuilt aircraft (models Quickie, Quickie Q2, and Quickie Q200 aircraft).  The original single-seater Quickie was designed by Burt Rutan and company founders Gene Sheehan and Tom Jewett.  The two-seater Q2 and Q200 were designed by Canadian Garry LeGare, Jewett and Sheehan.  While the Q2 and Q200 were based on the original Quickie, the design was completely different. Now defunct, the company sold over 2,000 kits in its lifetime.

The Quickie's canard wing used a GU25-5(11)8 airfoil, developed by Terence Nonweiler. It suffered performance degradation at low Reynolds numbers and in rainy conditions.

Gallery

References

External links

Aerofiles.com data on QAC
Quickie Builders Files and Photos

External links

Defunct aircraft manufacturers of the United States
Companies based in Kern County, California
Defunct companies based in California